Tinker is a settlement in New Brunswick, Canada. It is home to the Tinker Dam. The settlement is named after Frank Tinker, who was a station worker at Andover.

See also
List of communities in New Brunswick
Tinker Dam

References

Communities in Victoria County, New Brunswick